Richibucto (originally Liverpool) is a civil parish in Kent County, New Brunswick, Canada.

For governance purposes it is divided between the towns of Beaurivage and Grand-Bouctouche, the village of Five Rivers, and the Kent rural district, all of are members of the Kent Regional Service Commission, and the Indian Island 28 Indian reserve, which is not.

Prior to the 2023 governance reform, the parish was divided between the town of Richibucto, the village of Rexton, the Indian Island 28 Indian reserve, and the local service districts of Cap-de-Richibouctou, Sainte-Anne-de-Kent, and the parish of Richibucto. Richibucto and a border area west of it became part of Beaurivage, Rexton and most of the parish LSD part of Five Rivers, Sainte-Anne-de-Kent to Grand-Bouctouche, and Cap-de-Richibouctou to the rural district, with small exceptions along the various new borders.

Origin of name
The parish was named for the Richibucto River, which in turn is of Mi'kmaq origin.

History
Richibucto was erected from Carleton Parish as Liverpool parish in 1827. At the time it included modern Weldford Parish and all of Saint-Charles Parish south of the Saint-Charles River.

In 1832 the parish's name was changed to Richibucto.

In 1835 the southwestern part of the parish was erected as Weldford Parish.

In 1909 the newly erected Saint-Charles Parish included the settlements along the Kouchibouguacis River.

Boundaries
Richibucto Parish is bounded:

on the northwest by a line beginning on the northern line of Weldford Parish, near Aldouane Station Cross Road, then running northeasterly to a point on the northern boundary of the town of Richibucto about midway between Route 11 and Route 134, at the corner of a land grant, then northeasterly along the grant line to the rear of a grant on Northwest Branch, then southeasterly to the mouth of Thomas Brook, down Northwest Branch to Richibucto River, and out through Richibucto Harbour to Northumberland Strait;
on the east by Northumberland Strait;
on the south by the Chockpish River upstream as far as the mouth of the Rivière Chockpish-nord, then south 68º west to a point slightly west of East Branch Road;
on the west by a line running northwesterly to the mouth of Black Brook on the East Branch St. Nicholas River, then down the East Branch St. Nicholas and the St. Nicholas River to its mouth, then up the Richibucto River to the eastern line of the Richibucto 15 Indian reserve and along the reserve to its northernmost corner, then due west to the starting point.

Communities
Communities at least partly within the parish. bold indicates an incorporated municipality or Indian reserve

 Bedec
 Bells Mills
 Caissie-Village
 Cap-Lumière
 Côte-Sainte-Anne
 East Galloway
 Galloway
 Indian Island 28
 Jardineville
 Peters Mills
 Petit-Chockpish
 Pirogue
  Rexton
 Richibucto
  Richibucto-Village
 Saint-Charles Station
 Village-La-Prairie
 West Galloway

Bodies of water
Bodies of water at least partly within the parish.

 Rivière à Étienne
 Chockpish River
 Chockpish-nord River
 Rivière des Vaches
 Rivière du Cap
 Richibucto River
 St. Nicholas River
 Beatties Creek
 Big Cove Creek
 Childs Creek
 Gaspereau Creek
 McAlmon Creek
 Mill Creek
 Mooneys Creek
 Watering Creek
 Weldon Creek
 Geddes Lake
 Northumberland Strait
 Village Bay
 Richibucto Harbour
 Passe de l'Île
 Richibucto Gully

Islands
Islands at least partly within the parish.
 Indian Island
 McAlmon Island

Other notable places
Parks, historic sites, and other noteworthy places at least partly within the parish.
 Bonar Law Provincial Park

Demographics
Parish population total does not include incorporated municipalities and Indian reserve

Population
Population trend

Language
Mother tongue (2016)

See also
List of parishes in New Brunswick

Notes

References

External links
 Village of Rexton
 Town of Richibucto
 Kent Regional Service Commission

Local service districts of Kent County, New Brunswick
Parishes of Kent County, New Brunswick